is a 2015 Japanese revenge thriller film directed by Tomoyuki Takimoto and starring Toma Ikuta, Tadanobu Asano and Hey! Say! JUMP member Ryosuke Yamada. It was released in Japan on November 7, 2015. It is based on the 2004 novel of the same name by Kōtarō Isaka, the first novel in his Hitman trilogy. An American adaptation of the second novel, Bullet Train, was released in 2022.

Plot
After the death of his girlfriend, Suzuki (Ikuta Toma) takes on a job working for the underground. Suzuki is quickly caught up in a cat and mouse game between two groups of underground workers in the field of assassination. Caught up in the game alongside him are Kujira (Tadanobu Asano) and Semi (Ryosuke Yamada), who are both deadly killers.

Cast

Production
Principal photography began on 7 July 2014.

Reception
The film grossed  on its opening weekend. By its third weekend, it had grossed .

References

2015 thriller films
Japanese films about revenge
Films based on Japanese novels
Japanese thriller films
2010s Japanese films
2010s Japanese-language films
Hitman (novel series)